Kijabe is a genus of African goblin spiders first described by Lucien Berland in 1914.  it contains only two species.

References

Araneomorphae genera
Oonopidae